Alliance for a New Humanity is an international network of people from all walks of life who want to see positive change take place in the world.  It launched in Puerto Rico on December 11–14, 2003 with keynote speaker, Al Gore, former Vice-President of the United States.  

Its purpose is to connect sensitive individuals into a global human network to lead to the creation of a critical mass that influences national and international policy towards a more compassionate humanity.

It came to light spontaneously, when individuals from all walks of life, concerned about the dehumanizing trends that prevail in the world, got together to assess the deterioration of human values.  They concluded that this was caused by the accelerating economic and social inequalities, terrorism and wars, social violence, ecological degradation and a generalized spread of social fear, individual frustration and lack of respect for life.

They also concluded that the result of such social conditions has created an indifference to the other, reinforced by the materialistic models adopted as organizing principles of society with their emphasis on selfishness, competition, accumulation, and separateness.

There are currently about 600 members of the organization.

Founding members 

Founding members believe that many people in the world perceive the need for more positive thinking, for a more compassionate society and for a less poignant media envelope.  Founding members include: 
Oscar Arias Sánchez: former President of Costa Rica and the recipient of the 1987 Nobel Peace Prize
Dr. Deepak Chopra: a doctor, philosopher, speaker, and prolific writer and considered one of the world's greatest leaders in the field of mind-body medicine.
Antonio Fas Alzamora: an attorney, legislator, and the President of the Senate of Puerto Rico
Baltasar Garzón: one of the most distinguished judges in the world today and a leader in the legal fight against human rights violators.
Kerry Kennedy-Cuomo: an attorney and human rights activist, she has led more than forty human rights delegations to more than thirty countries.
Ashok Khosla: the founder and president of Development Alternatives and has been a consultant to the World Bank, United Nations and various other governmental and inter-governmental agencies.
Ricky Martin: An international superstar, he has sold more than 30 million albums in Spanish and English, and has performed for millions of people around the globe.
Sarah Ozacky-Lazar: co-director of the Jewish-Arab Center for Peace at Givat Haviva, Israel.
Roberto Savio: founder of the Inter Press Service and Secretary-General of the Society for International Development.
Betty Williams: winner of the 1976 Nobel Peace Prize, she is a steadfast peace activist.

External links
Official Website of the Alliance
External webpage with audio interviews
ANH news
Alliance for a New Humanity Wiki 

Civic and political organizations of the United States